Trujillo Airport  is an airport serving Trujillo, a municipality in the Colón Department on the northern coast of Honduras.

Numerous houses and hotels use the runway for access to the city.

Facilities

Airlines

See also
Transport in Honduras
List of airports in Honduras

References

External links
 
OurAirports - Trujillo Airport

Airports in Honduras
Atlántida Department